Carel is a given name, and may refer to:

Arts
 Carel Blotkamp, Dutch artist and art historian
 Carel de Moor, Dutch etcher and painter
 Carel Fabritius, Dutch painter and one of Rembrandt's most gifted pupils
 Carel van Mander, Flemish painter, poet and biographer
 Carel Vosmaer, Dutch poet and art-critic
 Jacques-Philippe Carel, Parisian cabinet-maker

Education
 Carel Gabriel Cobet, Dutch classical scholar
 Carel van Schaik, Dutch professor and director of the Anthropological Institute and Museum at the University of Zürich, Switzerland

Other fields
 Carel Godin de Beaufort, Dutch nobleman and Formula One driver
 Carel Victor Gerritsen (1850–1905), Dutch radical politician
 Carel Jan Scheneider, Dutch foreign service diplomat and writer
 Carel Struycken, character actor in film, television, and stage
 Johan Carel Marinus Warnsinck, Dutch naval officer and naval historian
 Tobias Michael Carel Asser, Dutch jurist

Dutch masculine given names
Masculine given names